Herald Investment Trust plc is a large United Kingdom-based investment trust focused predominantly on holdings of quoted small- and mid-cap technology, communications and media companies. Established in February 1994, the company is listed on the London Stock Exchange and is a constituent of the FTSE 250 Index. The fund is managed under the auspices of Herald Investment Management and its chairman is Ian Russell.

References

External links

Financial services companies established in 1994
Financial services companies of the United Kingdom
Companies listed on the London Stock Exchange